Columbia Historic District I is a national historic district located in the Arsenal Hill neighborhood at Columbia, South Carolina.  The district encompasses nine contributing buildings and includes a complex of fine mansions and attractive homes built before the American Civil War. The buildings are in the Greek Revival, Italianate, Classical Revival, and the “Columbia Cottage” styles.  They include the Governor's Mansion, Caldwell-Hampton-Boylston House, Lace House, and Palmetto Iron Works and Armory.

It was added to the National Register of Historic Places in 1971.

References

Historic districts on the National Register of Historic Places in South Carolina
Buildings and structures in Columbia, South Carolina
National Register of Historic Places in Columbia, South Carolina